Legio IV (or  IIII) Martia was a legion of the Roman Empire, part of the Late Roman army. Its genesis is uncertain, but it probably existed in the time of Diocletian, and certainly in the time of Notitia Dignitatum. That document places the legion at Betthorus, modern El-Lejjun in Jordan, under the command of the Dux Arabiae. The place was in the civil jurisdiction of Palaestina Tertia.

The legion also had a fortress at Adhruh near Petra. It was removed when the defence of the area was assigned to the vassal state of the Ghassanids around 530.

See also
List of Roman legions

References

04 Martia